Events from the year 1935 in Canada.

Incumbents

Crown 
 Monarch – George V

Federal government 
 Governor General – Vere Ponsonby, 9th Earl of Bessborough (until November 2) then John Buchan 
 Prime Minister – Richard B. Bennett (until October 23) then William Lyon Mackenzie King
 Chief Justice – Lyman Poore Duff (British Columbia)
 Parliament – 17th (until 14 August)

Provincial governments

Lieutenant governors 
Lieutenant Governor of Alberta – William Legh Walsh 
Lieutenant Governor of British Columbia – John William Fordham Johnson 
Lieutenant Governor of Manitoba – William Johnston Tupper  
Lieutenant Governor of New Brunswick – Hugh Havelock McLean (until February 8) then Murray MacLaren  
Lieutenant Governor of Nova Scotia – Walter Harold Covert 
Lieutenant Governor of Ontario – Herbert Alexander Bruce 
Lieutenant Governor of Prince Edward Island – George Des Brisay de Blois 
Lieutenant Governor of Quebec – Esioff-Léon Patenaude 
Lieutenant Governor of Saskatchewan – Hugh Edwin Munroe

Premiers 
Premier of Alberta – Richard Gavin Reid (until September 3) then William Aberhart    
Premier of British Columbia – Duff Pattullo 
Premier of Manitoba – John Bracken 
Premier of New Brunswick – Leonard Tilley (until July 16) then Allison Dysart 
Premier of Nova Scotia – Angus Lewis Macdonald
Premier of Ontario – Mitchell Hepburn 
Premier of Prince Edward Island – William J. P. MacMillan (until August 15) then Walter Lea
Premier of Quebec – Louis-Alexandre Taschereau 
Premier of Saskatchewan – James Garfield Gardiner (until November 1) then William John Patterson

Territorial governments

Commissioners 
 Controller of Yukon – George A. Jeckell 
 Commissioner of Northwest Territories – Vacant (Roy A. Gibson acting)

Events

January to June
January 2 – Prime Minister R. B. Bennett outlines his programme
February 11 – Goodwill, The Amity Group established
March 11
Bank of Canada established
The Bank of Canada issues a $500 banknote with Sir John A. Macdonald's portrait and a $1,000 note with Sir Wilfrid Laurier's portrait
May 6 – Silver Jubilee of George V's accession as King
May 7 – David Dunlap Observatory opens
May 25 – Cabot Monument unveiled, Montreal
June 5 – The On-to-Ottawa Trek begins
June 26 – "Regina Riot":  Royal Canadian Mounted Police fire into unarmed crowd of unemployed marchers in Regina, Saskatchewan

July to December
July 5 – Canadian Wheat Board established
July 16 – Allison Dysart becomes premier of New Brunswick, replacing Leonard Tilley
August 15 – Walter Lea becomes premier of Prince Edward Island for the second time, replacing William J. P. MacMillan
August 22 – 1935 Alberta general election: William Aberhart's Social Credit Party (SoCreds) wins a majority, defeating Richard G. Reid's United Farmers of Alberta
September 3 – Aberhart becomes premier of Alberta, replacing Reid
October 14 – Federal election: Mackenzie King's Liberals win a majority, defeating Bennett's Conservatives
October 3 – After the Italian invasion of Abyssinia, Canada refuses to support military intervention or sanctions
October 23 – Mackenzie King becomes prime minister for the third time, replacing Bennett
November 1
William Patterson becomes premier of Saskatchewan, replacing James Gardiner
The magnitude 6.2 Timiskaming earthquake shakes western Quebec

Sport
April 9 – The Montreal Maroons win their second and final Stanley Cup by defeating the Toronto Maple Leafs 3 games to 0. The deciding game was played at the Montreal Forum. This was the last time a non-Original Six team won the Stanley Cup until the Philadelphia Flyers won the 1974 Stanley Cup Finals.
April 13 – The Manitoba Junior Hockey League's Winnipeg Monarchs win their first Memorial Cup by defeating the Northern Ontario Hockey Association's  Sudbury Cub Wolves 2 games to 1. All game played at Shea's Amphitheatre in Winnipeg
December 7 – The Winnipeg 'Pegs become the first western team to win the Grey Cup by defeating the Hamilton Tigers 18 to 12 in the 23rd Grey Cup played at Hamilton Amateur Athletic Association Grounds

Births

January to June
January 6 – Joseph Rotman, Canadian businessman and philanthropist (d. 2015)
January 7 – Rey Pagtakhan, physician, professor, politician and Minister
January 10 – Ronnie Hawkins, pioneering rock and roll musician
January 14 – Lucille Wheeler, alpine skier, Olympic bronze medalist and World Champion
January 18 – Albert Millaire, actor and theatre director (d. 2018)
January 21 – Jack Tunney, professional wrestling promoter (d. 2004)
January 29 – Christina McCall, political writer (d. 2005)
February 9 – Ron Attwell, ice hockey player (d. 2017)
February 14 
Rob McConnell, jazz musician (d. 2010)
Howie Glover, ice hockey player (d. 2021)
February 21 – Jean Pelletier, politician and Mayor of Quebec City (d. 2009)
March 2 – Al Waxman, actor and director (d. 2001)
March 15 – Mary Pratt, painter (d. 2018)
March 24 – Mary Seeman, psychiatrist
April 16 – Ray Frenette, 28th Premier of New Brunswick (d. 2018)
April 22 – Rita Johnston, politician, Canada's first female premier and 29th Premier of British Columbia
April 28 – Murray McBride, politician
May 5 – Billy Two Rivers, wrestler (d. 2023)
May 7 – Isobel Warren, author
May 25 – W. P. Kinsella, novelist and short story writer (d. 2016)
May 26 – Pat Carney, politician, minister and senator
May 30 – Ruta Lee, actress
June 2 – Carol Shields, author (d. 2003)
June 28 – Bob Hobert, football player

July to December

July 3 – Bill Reichart, ice hockey player
July 11 – Bobbie Sparrow, politician
July 17 – Donald Sutherland, actor
July 23 – Danièle Dorice, singer and teacher (d. 2018)
July 24 – Bob McAdorey, television and radio broadcaster (d. 2005)
July 25 – Gilbert Parent, politician and 33rd Speaker of the Canadian House of Commons (d. 2009)
July 27
Don Mazankowski, politician and Minister (d. 2020)
François Barbeau, costume designer (d. 2016)
July 29 – Pat Lowther, poet (d. 1975)
August 30 – Daniel L. Norris, Commissioner of the Northwest Territories (d. 2008)
September 24 – Sean McCann, actor (d. 2019)
September 27 – Al MacNeil, ice hockey player and coach
October 3 – Floyd Laughren, politician
October 15 – Willie O'Ree, ice hockey player, first Black Canadian player in the National Hockey League
October 20 – Russell Doern, politician (d. 1987)
November 15 – Bill Graham, Canadian football player (d. 2020)
November 17 – Audrey Thomas, novelist and short story writer
December 9 – Christopher Pratt, painter and printmaker (d. 2022)
December 11 – Elmer Vasko, ice hockey player (d. 1998)
December 12 – John Wise, politician, MP for Elgin (1972–1988); Minister of Agriculture (1979–1980; 1984–1988) (d. 2013)
December 13 – Raymond Speaker, politician
December 21 – Edward Schreyer, politician, Premier of Manitoba and Governor General of Canada

Full date unknown
James Bourque, First Nations activist (d. 1996)
Lionel Giroux, midget wrestler (d. 1995)
J. Robert Janes, author
Alex Janvier, artist
Louise Laurin, educator and activist (d. 2013)

Deaths
March 15 – James Duncan McGregor, agricultural pioneer, politician and Lieutenant-Governor of Manitoba (b. 1860)
March 16 – John James Richard Macleod, physician, physiologist and Nobel laureate (b. 1876)
April 10 – Joseph Charles-Émile Trudeau, entrepreneur and father of Pierre Trudeau, who would later become Prime Minister of Canada (b. 1887)
April 19 – Willis Keith Baldwin, politician (b. 1857)
July 18 – George Clift King, politician and 2nd Mayor of Calgary (b. 1848)
September 30 – J. J. Kelso, journalist and social activist (b. 1864)
October 24 – Edward Morris, 1st Baron Morris, politician and 2nd Prime Minister of Newfoundland (b. 1859)
October 29 – Del Fontaine, Canadian middleweight boxing champion, executed for murder in the U.K.

See also
 List of Canadian films

Historical documents
On radio, PM Bennett declares "reform means Government intervention[,] control and regulation [and] the end of laissez faire"

In current national crisis, Commons Clerk suggests constituent assembly replace British North America Act with modern constitution

Prime Minister Bennett argues need to pass laws that courts will approve of

"The trouble is [lack of] accommodation designed objectively for the low wage earner" - House committee calls for national housing policy

In election broadcast, Bennett admits that at his age (65), "ambitions dim, the love of power dies"

PM King and President Roosevelt support trade – "another word for increased employment, transportation and consumption"

Secretary of State Hull says goal of U.S. foreign policy is to preserve peace of "friends," not of "inequality based on force"

Statement of 330 international psychiatrists warns of "evident war-psychosis" in global mentality

Tour of Flanders' grave-strewn fields, twenty years later

Eyewitnesses tell inquiry about clashes involving police, residents and On-to-Ottawa trekkers in Regina

Canadian Federation of the Blind founder explains to House committee need for pensions for blind people

Columbia University student newspaper's review of Maria Chapdelaine movie

References

 
Years of the 20th century in Canada
Canada
1935 in North America
1930s in Canada